Sir William Ray (7 February 1876 – 30 September 1937) was a Conservative politician in the United Kingdom. He was knighted in 1928. Ray was elected Member of Parliament (MP) for Richmond in 1932, resigning in 1937.

References

1876 births
1937 deaths
Conservative Party (UK) MPs for English constituencies
Knights Bachelor
Members of London County Council
UK MPs 1931–1935
UK MPs 1935–1945